The Communist Party of Greece (Kommounistikó Kómma Elládas, KKE) is a  political party in Greece. 
Founded in 1918 as the Socialist Labour Party of Greece and adopted its current name in November 1924. It is the oldest political party in modern Greek politics. The party was banned in 1936, but played a significant role in the Greek resistance and the Greek Civil War, and its membership peaked in the mid-1940s. Legalization of the KKE was restored following the fall of the Greek military junta of 1967–1974.

The party has returned MPs in all elections since its restoration in 1974, and took part in a coalition government in 1989 when it got more than 13% of the vote.

History

Foundation 

The October Revolution of the Bolsheviks in Russia in 1917 gave impetus for the foundation of Communist parties in many countries globally. The KKE was founded on 4 November 1918

by Aristos Arvanitis, Stamatis Kokkinos, Michael Sideris, and others. The party was run by a five-member Central Committee which initially consisted of Dimitratos, Ligdopoulos, Sideris, Arvanitis and Kokkinos, and had a three-member Audit Committee initially including George Pispinis, Spyros Koumiotis and Avraam Benaroya. Ligdopoulos was elected director of the party's official newspaper, Ergatikos Agon.

The background of KKE has roots in more than 60 years of small socialist, anarchist and communist groups, mainly in industrialized areas. Following the example of the Paris Commune and the 1892 Chicago workers' movement for the eight-hour working day, these groups had as immediate political goals the unification of Greek workers into trade unions, the implementation of an eight-hour day in Greece and better salaries for workers. Inspired by the Paris Commune and the communist revolutionary efforts in the United States, Germany and Russia at the beginning of the century and the destruction that almost 20 years of wars had brought upon the Greek workers, a unified Social-Communist party was founded in Greece.

At the Second Congress of the SEKE in April 1920, the party decided to affiliate with Comintern, an international Communist organisation founded in Moscow in 1919. It changed its name to the Socialist Labour Party of Greece-Communist (SEKE-K). A new Central Committee was elected, which included Nikos and Panaghis Dimitratos, Yannis Kordatos, G. Doumas and M. Sideris. At the Third Extraordinary Congress of the SEKE-K in November 1924, the party was renamed the Communist Party of Greece and adopted the principles of Marxism–Leninism. Pandelis Pouliopoulos was elected as general-secretary. Ever since, the party has functioned on the basis of democratic centralism.

KKE between the two World Wars 
KKE strongly opposed Greece's involvement in the Greco-Turkish War of 1919–1922, which it considered an imperialistic scheme to control the market of Asia Minor given the new political situation after the Ottoman Empire's collapse. KKE members propagated this position both on the front—which provoked accusations of treason from the Greek government—as well as in the mainland. KKE collaborated with the Soviet ambassador to persuade Venizelos' administration to withdraw its troops from Asia Minor and to persuade the Soviet Union to exert political pressure on Mustafa Kemal Atatürk to allow autonomy for Greek cities in Asia Minor.

KKE played a prominent role in strikes, anti-war demonstrations, foundation of trade unions and worker associations. KKE and other leftist political forces fostered the creation of labor unions in all sectors, including the General Greek Workers Confederation (ΓΣΕΕ), which shared common goals with KKE.

These activities met by opposition from the Mid-War governments. In 1929, as minister of Education in the government of Eleftherios Venizelos, Georgios Papandreou passed legislation against organised communist teachers, known as Idionymon. Such legislation was often used to prosecute KKE members and other leftist activists. Under the Idionymon all members of the Communist Party of Greece, being considered dangers to the state, were to be removed from public service or put in exile.

The first prison camps for left-wing citizens and communists were founded in that era. KKE and its organisations, although small in numbers, continue operating in all Greek major cities, especially industrial areas such as Athens, Piraeus, Patra, Thessaly and Volos, Thessaloniki, Kavala and elsewhere.

KKE collaborated with other newly founded Communist Parties to oppose the rise of the fascist movement in Europe. In 1932, the Comintern decreed that anti-fascist fronts be formed internationally. KKE responded by creating the People's Front, which was the largest Marxist anti-fascist organisation in Greece prior to the dictatorship of Ioannis Metaxas.

The party was banned in 1936 by the dictatorial 4th of August Regime of Metaxas and brutally persecuted by his security chief, Konstantinos Maniadakis. Many KKE members were imprisoned or exiled on isolated Aegean Islands.

KKE members volunteered to fight on the side of the republican government of Spain during the Spanish Civil War of 1936–1939. About 440 Greeks joined the ranks of the International Brigade, Especially brigades such as the XV International Brigade and the Dimitrov Battalion, many of whom were high-ranking KKE members.

KKE and the Macedonian issue 
After the Balkan Wars of 1912–1913, World War I in 1916–1918 and the disastrous Greco–Turkish War of 1919–1922, there were diplomatic approaches from the superpowers of that era regarding the re-drawing of Greek borders, based on Bulgaria and Turkey–United States relations pressing for more territory to improve trade routes with the British Empire. The ruling parties were simultaneously trying to move parts of Northern Greece (Macedonia and Thrace) to Bulgaria and Turkey; and to win the return of islands in the Aegean and parts of Macedonian territory to the Kingdom of Yugoslavia. This policy was reiterated several times throughout the pre-war era.

The main impetus for their demand was the ethnic and religious minorities then living inside Greek borders in Northern Greece. KKE opposed any geo-strategic game in the area which would use minorities to start a new imperialistic war in the region. At its Third Party Congress in 1924, KKE announced its policy for the self-determination of minorities, pointing out the minorities in Macedonia. Its policy was dictated by each Marxist–Leninist theory, that stated any minorities should be self-determined under a common socialist state and it had its roots in the example of the newly founded Soviet Union.

In 1924, KKE expressed the official position of the Third International for "independent Macedonia and Thrace". Some members disagreed with this, but it remained the official position of the party and caused expulsions of communists by the Greek state. KKE was seen by many as a party whose policy was "the detachment of large areas of northern Greece". According to Richard Clogg, "this was dictated by Comintern and hurt the popularity of Communism at the time".

In 1934, KKE changed its view and expressed its intent to "fight for the national self-determination, under a People's Republic where all nations will found their self-determination and will build the common state of the workers".

Nikos Zachariadis, General Secretary of the party, officially renounced KKE's policy of secession in 1945. Anti-KKE propaganda up-to-day added on this quote the will to collaborate for this goal with the Bulgarian organizations of the Internal Macedonian Revolutionary Organization and the Thracian Revolutionary Organisation. This is not mentioned on any of KKE official documents. The quote is referenced as KKE's policy for "giving Greek soil to the northern enemies of the country", a fact that can not be crossed referenced with any of KKE referenced literature of that era.

During the civil war (1946–1949), an article written by Nikos Zachariadis expressed the KKE's strategy after the envisioned victory of the Democratic Army of Greece regarding what was then known as the "Macedonian Issue": "The Macedonian people will acquire an independent, united state with a coequal position within the family of free peoples' republics within the Balkans, within the family of Peoples' Republics to which the Greek people will belong. The Macedonian people are today fighting for this independent united state with a coequal position and is helping the DSE with all its soul". The policy of self-determination for Macedonia within a People's Republic was reiterated during the 5th KKE Central Committee meeting held in January 1949, which declared that the "Macedonian people participating in the liberation struggle would find their full national re-establishment as they want giving their blood for this acquisition [...] Macedonian Communists should pay great attentions to foreign chauvinist and counteractive elements that want to break the unity between the Greek and Macedonian people. This will only serve the monarcho-fascists and British imperialism". These statements can be explained due to the large number of Slavomacedonian fighters (30–50%) amongst the DSE fighters and prompted the government in Athens to begin a campaign against KKE and the party's military wing, the Democratic Army of Greece (DSE), blaming them for secession plans in northern Greece.

In order for KKE to clear up its position on the "Macedonian subject", the 6th Congress of its Central Committee was called a few months later, during which was clearly stated that KKE was fighting for a free Greece and for a common future for Greeks and Macedonians under the same state.

The issue was ended by Central Committee in 1954 with the withdrawal of the position of self-determination of minorities. In 1988, the General Secretary of KKE, Charilaos Florakis, once again presented KKE's political position on the matter in a speech to the Greek Parliament.

KKE during World War II

1940 
By 1940, KKE had almost collapsed after Metaxas' dictatorship had imprisoned many of its leadership and members. By October, half of the party's two thousand members were in prison or in exile. The Security Police proved successful in dismantling the party structure; not only had it imprisoned the leadership, but it created a fake series of Rizospastis, the Central Committee newspaper. This generated confusion among the remaining scattered underground members.

A small group of old party officials formed the "Old Central Committee" and two of them were elected by the 6th Conference. In his memoirs for the Greek Civil war, C. M. Woodhouse (the British liaison with Greek resistance groups during World War II) wrote: "The 'Old Central Committee' interpreted a directive issued by Comintern as indicating collaboration with the German and Italian dictatorships, given the Hitler-Stalin alliance". On the other hand, Woodhouse argues that Georgios Siantos, who had escaped from prison; and Nikos Zachariadis, who was still incarcerated, took the opposite view that KKE must support Metaxas in his fight against Mussolini. The archives of KKE also address the confusion between different KKE cadres as the "Old Committee" interpreted the politics of Nazi Germany and Fascist Italy as part of the "imperialistic game between the Axis forces and the British". This faction of KKE felt that the Metaxas regime was a "pawn of British imperialism in the region" and therefore the "Old Committee" viewed any war between the Axis forces and the British as an "imperialistic war that the people of any of the countries involved should not participate in". According to KKE's account, this position was criticised by Comintern in 1939 (a few months after the Molotov–Ribbentrop Pact), which had instructed KKE to fight against Italy in the event of an invasion of Greece.

Nikos Zachariadis, KKE General Secretary, wrote from prison on 2 November 1940: "Today the Greek people are waging a war of national liberation against Mussolini's fascism. In this war we must follow the Metaxas government and turn every city, every village and every house of Greece into a stronghold of the National Liberation Fight... On this war conducted by Metaxas government all of us should give all our forces without reservation. The working people's and the crowning achievement for today's fight should be and shall be a new Greece based on work, freedom, and liberated from any foreign imperialist dependence, with a truly pan-popular culture".

Several party members, including Nikos Ploumpidis of the "Old Central Committee", denounced this letter as a forgery produced by the Metaxas regime. Zachariadis was even accused of writing it to win the favour of Konstantinos Maniadakis, the Minister for Public Order, to win his release from prison. According to one source, when drafting this letter Zachariadis was unaware of the German–Soviet Non-aggression Pact and was castigated by the Comintern for an anti-Soviet stance.

According to KKE's archives, the "Old Central Committee" had been denounced for its stance on the war issue and today KKE claims that the majority of the party membership had not followed the decision of being neutral in case of an invasion. On 16 November 1940, Zachariadis repudiated the line of his first letter in a second letter where he accused the Greek Army of waging a "fascist" and "imperialistic war" and appealed to the Soviet Union for peaceful intervention, thus aligning his position with that of the "Old Central Committee".

On 7 December 1940, the "Old Central Committee" issued a manifesto addressed "to all the workers and public servants, to all soldiers, sailors and airmen, to patriot officers, to the mothers, fathers, wives and children of the fighters and the workers of all neighboring countries", in which it describes the war as a game of the imperialist powers, headed by the British. According to KKE, the "Old Central Committee" based this opinion on the belief that Mussolini's Italy would not dare to attack a country that had a cooperation agreement with the Soviet Union. The main political line of this manifesto was the call to the soldiers on the front not to go beyond Greek borders, but after securing them to try seek a peace agreement with the enemy.

Zachariadis may have issued a third letter on 17 January 1941, in which he explained the motives for his first letter and wrote: "Metaxas remains the principal enemy of the people and the country. His overthrowing is in the most immediate and vital interest of our people ... the peoples and soldiers of Greece and Italy are not enemies but brothers, and their solidarity will stop the war waged by capitalist exploiters". 

According to KKE archives, Zachariadis had issued no further letters and the third letter may have been in fact the statement of the "Old Central Committee" on 18 March 1941. In any case, Zachariadis himself referred in his public statements after liberation almost exclusively to his first letter as proof of the patriotic character of KKE and its role as an inspiration to the Greek resistance movement during the war.

On 22 June 1941, the very same day that Hitler attacked the Soviet Union, KKE ordered its militants to organize "the struggle to defend the Soviet Union and the overthrow of the foreign fascist yoke".

1941: German invasion and beginning of the Resistance 

On 6 April 1941, the German invasion was launched and Athens was occupied on 27 April following an unconditional surrender of the Greek forces by General Georgios Tsolakoglou, who was later appointed Prime Minister by the Nazis. Confusion remained among many Greek Communists as to what the Moscow-sanctioned position was. In his memoirs, KKE leader Ioannis Ioannidis wrote about a regional communist cadre who proclaimed the following as Greece was being bombed by the Axis: "The Germans will not bomb us. The mustached-one [Stalin] will not let them".  Ioannis Ioannidis was purged by Nikos Zachariades, leader of the KKE in exile in 1953, and was stripped of his party offices.  The article in the reference just cited ends with just the fact of his "Purge" and being "stripped of his Party offices", so it is unclear whether he was physically Purged (executed), as many Communists still were in 1953.

A large number of KKE members were already in prison before the Nazi invasion. The pro-Nazi occupation government handed some of them over to the Nazis fearing that they—following the pro-Soviet party line—would resort to sabotage in Greece following Hitler's attack on the Soviet Union on 22 June 1941. There were many occasions that police officers released Communist prisoners, especially the ones that they were in exile in Aegean islands. In 1941, several KKE members managed to escape prison. One of the many stories includes the 20 communists held as political prisoners in Heraklion, Crete. They demanded to be released to fight against the invading Germans. The Greek government, which had left mainland Greece by then and was en route to Egypt, had no power to release them. They eventually escaped after their jail was damaged by German bombs and joined the British and Greek forces defending the Heraklion harbor. After the fall of Crete, many officers of the Greek Army joined forces with ELAS and became commanders in ELAS's corps of partisan units.

It became German policy—especially after it became obvious to them that they were losing the war—to execute civilians in retaliation for attacks against them by communist or non-communist partisans. Approximately 200 communists, delivered to the Germans on 1941, were executed at the Kaisariani Shooting Range on 1 May 1944.

Although KKE was suffering from a lack of central political leadership since its leader Nikos Zachariades had been taken by the Germans to the Dachau concentration camp, its members succeeded in maintaining communication with each other. The 6th Meeting of KKE Central Committee was held in Athens from 1–3 July 1941, which decided on strategy for an armed liberation struggle against the Axis invaders. At the same time, the "Old Central Committee" submitted to the authority of the new Central Committee. The first united resistance organization was founded in the regions of Macedonia and Thrace on 15 May 1941. In Thessaloniki, the Macedonian Bureau of KKE established the Eleftheri (Liberty) Organization, along with the Socialist Party, the Agrarian Party, the Democratic Union and Colonel Dimitrios Psarros (who later founded the EKKA).

The Macedonian Bureau of KKE organised the first two partisan units at the end of June 1941. The first was based in Kilkis and was named Athanasios Diakos, the second was based in Nigrita and was named Odysseas Androutsos. These small partisan units blew up bridges, attacked police stations and eventually organized into larger combat units of more than 300 men each. In several other places and in major cities, small armed groups of KKE members and non-communists began to emerge, protecting people from looters, the Germans, or collaborators. On 27 September 1941, Greek communists together with five other leftist parties formed the National Liberation Front (EAM) in Kallithea, Athens and began forming partisan militia units.

1942 to Liberation 

On 16 February 1942, the Greek People's Liberation Army (ELAS) was founded in a small kiosk in Fthiotida and by 1943 it consisted of 50,000 members, both men and women, with 30,000 as reserve units in major cities. The KKE played a prominent role in the organisation. By the end of the war, some 200,000 Greek citizens, both workers and peasants, had joined the ranks of KKE. KKE maintained its alliances with the EAM. Its main stated aim at this time was to form a united government with all parties that wanted to see Greece liberated from foreign powers.

ELAS conflicted finally with the rest of the resistance organizations and armies (especially EDES and EKKA), accusing most of them of being traitors and collaborators of the Nazis. These were the first conflicts of the coming civil war.

Nikos Zachariadis was imprisoned in Dachau; he was released in 1945 and returned to Greece as the elected general secretary of the KKE. During his imprisonment, Andreas Tsipas and Georgios Siantos served as party general secretaries.

KKE and the Greek Civil War 

After the liberation of Greece from the Nazi German forces, the government of National Unity, led by G. Papandreou, landed in Athens in October 1944. The government was formed after the Treaty of Cazerta and its main purpose was to form the new Greek state, try accused political and military personnel of collaboration with the Germans and to hold a referendum for the government and the constitution. After the first weeks, it was obvious that British policy in the region was against these goals as KKE and EAM were controlling 98% of Greece and they were afraid of the foundation of new socialist state. Papandreou demanded the disarmament of ELAS and the trials of the collaborators were stalled. Meanwhile, British troops together with the "refined" Greek arm divisions after the prosecution of thousands of EAM members in the middle east, loyal to the Papandreou segment, were landing in all major Greek cities and EAM was welcoming them as liberators. In mid-November 1944, the situation escalated dramatically, KKE criticised the interference of British General Scobie in Greek affairs, EAM refused to disarm ELAS and ELAN. Six ministers of the EAM, resigned from their positions in the government of Georgios Papandreou in November 1944. Fighting broke out in Athens on 3 December 1944 during a demonstration organised by EAM and involving more than 100,000 people. According to some accounts, the police, covered by British troops, opened fire on the crowd. More than 28 people were killed and 148 injured. According to other accounts, it is uncertain if the first shots were fired by the police or the demonstrators. A member of the pro-monarchists Nikos Farmakis, in one of his interviews revealed that they had a direct order to fire at will when the demonstrators reach the court of the Palace. This incident was the beginning of the 37‑day Battle of Athens (Dekemvriana). Following a ceasefire agreement called the Treaty of Varkiza, ELAS laid down the majority of its weapons and dissolved all of its units. Right-wing groups, including elements which had collaborated with the Germans, seized this opportunity to persecute many KKE members.

According to EAM figures, in the few months after the Treaty of Varkiza the anticommunist violence on the Greek mainland had resulted in the imprisonment or exile of 100,000 ELAS partisans and EAM members, the deaths of 3,000 EAM officials and members, the rape of between 200 and 500 women, the burning of houses and other acts of violence. The KKE Central Committee issued a directive to all party forces not to engage in any armed conflict, but to try to prevent attacks by other means. This caused confusion among the majority of its supporters and served to weaken the party organisation across the country.

Large groups had returned to their partisan hideouts in the mountains and gradually formed smaller partisan units. As most of the ELAS armoury had been surrendered under the terms of the Varkiza treaty, these units armed themselves with weapons seized from attacks on militia units that had been provided arms by the police as well as attacking police stations. By mid-1946, these units forced the KKE leadership to change its neutral position and to plan the formation of a partisan army with the officers and fighters that were still free. On 26 October 1946, KKE militia units attacked the police station in Litochoro, armed their forces and founded the Central Greece Command of the Democratic Army of Greece (DSE). After this successful operation, the remaining scattered groups reorganized the pre-Varkiza Treaty ELAS formations all over the country. KKE's political influence and organization structure helped form units in the Aegean Islands of as Mytilene, Chios, Ikaria, Samos and Crete.

The Civil War involved two sides. On the one side was the British and American-backed Greek government, led by Konstantinos Tsaldaris and later Themistoklis Sophoulis, which was elected in the 1946 elections which the KKE had boycotted. On the other side was the Democratic Army of Greece, of which the KKE was the only major political force, backed by the NOF, Bulgaria, Yugoslavia and Albania.

In December 1947, KKE and its allies that participated in the Civil War formed the Provisional Democratic Government ("Mountain Government") under the premiership of Markos Vafiadis. After this, the KKE (still legal due to the Treaty of Varkiza) turned illegal.

On 29 January 1949, the Greek National Army appointed General Alexander Papagos Commander-in-Chief. In August 1949, Papagos launched a major counter-offensive against DSE forces in northern Greece, code-named "Operation Torch". The plan was for the Greek National Army to gain control of the border with Albania in order to surround and defeat the DSE forces, numbering 8,500 fighters. The DSE suffered heavy losses from the operation, but managed to retreat its units to Albania.

Charilaos Florakis, whose nom de guerre was Kapetan Yiotis, was a DSE-appointed Brigadier General during this battle. Florakis was ordered by the DSE High Command to re-enter Greece with his battalion via the Gramos Mountains and try to establish connection with all the DSE forces that remained within Greece. The battalion indeed reached small DSE units south of Gramos down to Evritania and retreated thereafter back to Albania. Floriakis later served as General Secretary of KKE from 1972 to 1989.

On 28 August 1949, the Civil War in Greece ended with the DSE forces defeated militarily and politically and KKE entered a new phase in its history.

Post-war era 
After the Civil War, the KKE was outlawed and most of its prominent members had to flee Greece, go underground or provide a signed declaration that they renounced communism to avoid prosecution as under Law 504, issued in 1948, a large number of KKE members were either prosecuted, jailed or exiled. Prominent members of the KKE were tried and executed, including Nikos Beloyannis in 1952 and Nikos Ploumpidis in 1954. The execution of Ploumpidis was the last such execution by the post-Civil War governments. The fear of widespread reaction from left-wing citizens curbed further executions and eventually led to the gradual release of most political prisoners. In 1955, there were 4,498 political prisoners and 898 exiles while in 1962 there were 1,359 prisoners and 296 exiles. However, under the prevailing anticommunist rules the communists and KKE sympathizers were barred from the public sector and lived under a repressive anticommunist surveillance system. Such discrimination against communists was partially relieved with the legalization of KKE in 1974 and the discrimination ended in the 1980s.

During this period of illegality, the KKE supported the United Democratic Left (EDA) Party. EDA functioned as the legal political expression of the outlawed KKE. It was not openly communist and attracted moderate voters reaching 70,000 members in the early 60s. Moreover, EDA had a very active youth wing. Historians have argued that the two parties operated parallel paths, something that contributed to the 1968 split between KKE and KKE Esoterikou.

Former king Constantine II claims that in 1964 he proposed to George Papandreou (senior) that the KKE be legalized. According to the former monarch, Papandreou refused to comply so as not to lose his party's left-wing supporters. This allegation cannot be verified as it was expressed after Papandreou's death. Moreover, Constantine's public statements regarding communism during the 1960s renders the veracity of this allegation questionable.

During the junta 

On 21 April 1967, a group of right-wing Greek Army colonels led by Georgios Papadopoulos successfully carried out a coup d'état on the pretext of imminent "communist threat", establishing what became known as the Regime of the Colonels. All political parties, including EDA, were dissolved and civil liberties were suppressed for all Greek citizens. KKE members were persecuted along with other opponents of the junta.

In 1968, a crisis escalated between KKE's two main factions. The crisis was already festering during the 12th plenum of the party's central committee held in Budapest between 5 and 15 February 1968 in which three members of the politbureau (M. Partsalidis, Z. Zografos and P. Dimitriu) were expelled for fractionist activity and was further triggered by the Soviet invasion of Czechoslovakia. This event led a number of Greek communists who were ideologically leaning with the so-called opportunist faction to break with KKE that was loyal to the Socialist Republic's policy and to follow the nascent Eurocommunist line, which favored a more pluralistic approach to socialism. A relatively large group split from KKE, forming what became the Communist Party of Greece (Interior). The spin-off party forged bonds with Eurocommunist parties such as the Italian Communist Party as well as with Nicolae Ceauşescu's Romanian Communist Party. Its supporters referred to KKE as the KKE (Exterior) ("ΚΚΕ εξωτερικού"), inferring that KKE's policies were dictated by the Politburo of the Communist Party of the Soviet Union.

Despite the difficulties resulting from the split, KKE continued its opposition to the Greek Junta throughout the next six years. Its political fighting against the regime took the form of labour disruptions and strikes and small demonstrations all over the country. Its power was rising inside the Universities where the newly founded Communist Youth of Greece (KNE) began working underground. KKE underground forces continued to work closely with other political groups of the center and left within Greece and abroad. In many European capitals anti-Junta committees were founded to support the struggle in Greece.

Legalisation 
After the restoration of parliamentary democracy in 1974, Constantine Karamanlis legalised the KKE hoping to reclaim "a vital part of national memory". In the 1974 elections, the KKE participated with the KKE Interior and the EDA under the name of the United Left, receiving 9.36 per cent of the vote. In the elections from 1977 to 1989, the KKE participated on its own.

In 1989, the political consequences of the Civil War were finally lifted. The war was named "Civil War" instead of "War against the gangs" ("συμμοριτοπόλεμος"), that was the official state name for that era up until that point and DSE fighters were named "DSE fighters" instead of "Communist Gangfighters" ("κουμουνιστοσυμμορίτες").

Participation in government 
In 1944, KKE participated in the national unity government of George Papandreou, holding the positions of Minister of Finance, Minister of Agriculture, Minister of Labor, Minister of National Economy and Public Works and Deputy Minister of Finance.

In 1988, KKE and Greek Left (Greek EAP; the former KKE Interior), along with other left-wing parties and organisations, formed the Coalition of the Left and Progress (Synaspismos). In the June 1989 elections, Synaspismos gained 13.1 per cent of votes and joined a coalition with New Democracy to form a short-lived government amidst a political spectrum shaken by accusations of economic scandals against the previous administration of Andreas Papandreou's Panhellenic Socialist Movement. In November of the same year, Synaspismos participated in the "Universal Government" with New Democracy and Panhellenic Socialist Movement which appointed Xenophon Zolotas as Prime Minister for three months. In 1991, KKE withdrew from Synaspismos. Some KKE members left the party and remained in Synaspismos, which evolved into a separate left-wing party that is now an alliance of Synaspismos with other leftist groups called the Coalition of the Radical Left.

21st century 

KKE actively participated in the anti-austerity protests beginning in 2010 
and also supported Greek steel worker's strikes.

In the first 2012 legislative election held on 6 May, the party got 8.5% of the vote and increased its parliamentary seats by 5 for a total of 26 seats.

However, in the second 2012 legislative election held a month later, on 17 June 2012, the party's support halved, resulting in a loss of 4% and 14 MPs. After the failure of the Hellenic Parliament to elect a new President of State in late 2014, the parliament was dissolved and a snap legislative election was scheduled for 25 January 2015, where the party increased its support by 1 percentage point, to 5.5%. At the fresh elections later that year, the party got a slight increase of 0.1% to reach 5.6% of the vote.

Since the 2015 election, the party saw a further increase in its support in opinion polls, overtaking the former major party PASOK to reach 4th place.

Although KKE was again overtaken by PASOK (now called Movement for Change – KINAL) in the 2019 election, it nonetheless managed to maintain a fourth-place in the polls, due to the decline of far-right party Golden Dawn.

Policies

Economy 
The KKE proposes the nationalization of the means of production and a restructuring centralisation of the economy: consequently, it requires a scientific planning oriented to meet all the needs of the Greek people (for example: jobs, health care, education, culture, sport...).

Furthermore, the KKE is absolutely opposed to Greece remaining in the European Union and NATO.

LGBT rights 

KKE voted against the Civil Partnerships Bill proposed by Syriza in December 2015 responding, among other things:
The family is a social relationship, it is an institution for the protection of children, as it was formed in the context of today's society, capitalism. We also believe that civil marriage should be the only, obligatory form of marriage. And whoever wants, let him have the right to the corresponding religious ceremony. But you do not touch upon this urban modernization that has taken place in other countries for years.

If the government wanted to introduce a less "bureaucratic" civil marriage, it could propose the necessary amendments to the Civil Code. There is no need for two legal regulations (civil marriage and cohabitation agreement) on the rights and obligations between spouses, the core of which is the potential reproduction, upbringing and upbringing of children.

Today, this is confirmed by the fact that the Cohabitation Agreement is extended in terms of obligations and rights of both parties, which essentially resembles marriage and especially by the fact that it extends to same-sex couples. Greece's condemnation by the European Court of Justice, cited by the government and the Report, was not a breach of any positive obligation imposed by the European Convention on Human Rights. But it was a negative discrimination against homosexual scales, but in the context of the institutionalization of the Cohabitation Pact. If there was no Cohabitation Pact for heterosexual couples, there would be no question of condemning Greece.

The aim of the bill is essentially the institutional recognition of same-sex couples, including – in a process – the acquisition of children by them. And there, is our disagreement.

Rights and obligations arise within marriage, which is the legal expression of the social relations of the family. It includes social protection of children, who are biologically the result of sexual relations between a man and a woman.

With the formation of a socialist-communist society, a new type of partnership will undoubtedly be formed—a relatively stable heterosexual relationship and reproduction.

Many democratic socialist parties, including Syriza, denounced the KKE's stance as bigotry.

However, the KKE also supports strengthening legislation to punish homophobic behavior, and has spoken against such discrimination, stating that "Unacceptable and condemnable discrimination and violence against our fellow human beings, based on their sexual orientation and other personal characteristics, are not addressed by cheap declarations of equality and words of sympathy, but by strengthening legislation against perpetrators of sexism, racism and homophobia, with the full social support of those who suffer from such behaviors. A real shield against such discrimination is collectivism, the struggle for modern social rights for all people."

Drug reform 
KKE opposes decriminalization of drug consumption and drug trafficking. It opposes the division of drugs on more and less harmful, considering harm reduction legislation as "dominant bourgeois policy". It also opposes substitution rehabilitation programs (and endorses "cold turkey" programs) as it believes drug substitutes replace one addiction for another.

KKE positions on drug reform are summed up, among other texts, in an article on one of their websites:(KKE).. is opposed both to the current repressive policy that imprisons users and frees traders and to the problem management policies as well as to the efforts to privatize the existing detoxification and prevention services.

KKE believes in tackling the drug problem effectively. It supports the only realistic solution which is to strengthen the prevention – treatment – reintegration efforts. It says: No to ALL drugs. It denies the separation of soft – hard (drugs). It does not believe in substitution programs, which maintain drug addiction and do not cure it. The substitution should concern special groups (eg with chronic diseases). NO to the decriminalization of hashish. "Demand reduction" policy not "harm reduction" policy.

Other policies 
The KKE celebrates the rule of Joseph Stalin and considers him a champion of socialism.

The KKE supports the separation of church and state. However, religious people are allowed to join the party and it also has religious associates such as Liana Kanelli.

The party considers China an imperialist power and a capitalist country, and considers the Chinese Communist Party to have lost its revolutionary elements.

The KKE advocates Greek patriotism and left-wing nationalism alongside proletarian internationalism and considers it its patriotic duty to oppose Greece's EU membership.

Splits and alliances 

In 1956, after the 20th Congress of the Communist Party of the Soviet Union at which Nikita Khrushchev denounced the excesses of Joseph Stalin, a faction created the Group of Marxist–Leninists of Greece (OMLE), which split from party in 1964, becoming the Organisation of Marxists-Leninists of Greece.

In 1968, amidst the Greek military junta of 1967–1974 and the Soviet invasion of Czechoslovakia, a relatively big group split from KKE, forming KKE Interior, claiming to be directed from within Greece rather than from the Soviet Union.

In 1988, KKE and Greek Left (the former KKE Interior), along with other left parties and organisations, formed the Coalition of the Left and Progress.

Also in 1988, the vast majority of members and officials from Communist Youth of Greece (KNE), the KKE's youth wing, split to form the New Left Current (NAR), drawing mainly youth in major cities, especially in Thessaloniki.

In the early 2000s, a small group of major party officials such as Mitsos Kostopoulos left the party and formed the Movement for the United in Action Left (KEDA), which in the 2007 legislative election participated in the Coalition of the Radical Left (Syriza), which was to win the 2015 national elections with a plurality.

Youth organisation 

KKE's youth organization is the Communist Youth of Greece, which closely supports KKE's goals and strategic targets.

Current activities 

KKE is a force in the Greek political scene, rallying a significant amount of support within the organized working-class movement. KKE is currently trying to mold a loose and rather disorganised international communist movement along a purely Marxist–Leninist line. Since its 18th congress (February 2009), KKE has opened up a discussion within the ranks and more broadly within the Greek left-leaning community on the future evolution of communism in the 21st century, with a particular emphasis on examining the causes of the collapse of the Socialist system in the former Soviet Union and in Eastern Europe.

The KKE stands in elections and has representatives in the Greek Parliament, local authorities and the European Parliament, where its two MEPs sit with the Non-Inscrits. On 3 June 2014, following the 2014 European elections the Central Committee of the KKE announced that it would no longer continue the party's affiliation to the European United Left–Nordic Green Left (GUE/NGL) group in the European parliament.

It publishes the daily newspaper Rizospastis. It also publishes the political and theoretical journal Komounistiki Epitheorisi (Communist Review) every two months and a journal covering educational issues, Themata Paideias.

The congresses of the Communist Party of Greece 
 The 1st congress – November 1918, Piraeus
 The 2nd congress – April 1920, Athens
 Extraordinary pre-election congress – September 1920, Athens
 Extraordinary congress – October 1922, Athens
 Extraordinary pre-election congress – September 1923, Athens
 The 3rd (extraordinary) congress – 26 November–3 December 1924, Athens
 The 3rd (ordinary) congress – March 1927, Athens
 The 4th congress – December 1928, Athens
 The 5th congress – March 1934, Athens
 The 6th congress – December 1935, Athens
 The 7th congress – October 1945, Athens
 The 8th congress – August 1961 (illegally)
 The 9th congress – December 1973 (illegally)
 The 10th congress – May 1978
 The 11th congress – December 1982, Athens
 The 12th congress – May 1987
 The 13th congress – 19–24 February 1991, Athens
 The 14th congress – 18–21 December 1991, Athens
 The 15th congress – 22–26 May 1996, Athens
 The 16th congress – 14–17 December 2000, Athens
 The 17th congress – 9–12 February 2005, Athens
 The 18th congress – 18–22 February 2009, Athens
 The 19th congress – 11–14 April 2013, Athens
 The 20th congress – 30 March – 2 April 2017, Athens
 The 21st congress – 24–27 June 2021, Athens
KKE delegations participated in international conferences of Communist and working parties (1957, 1960, 1969, Moscow). KKE approved the documents accepted at the conferences.

List of First Secretaries and General Secretaries 

 Nikolaos Dimitratos (November 1918 – February 1922), expelled from the party on charges of "suspect behavior"
 Yanis Kordatos (February–November 1922)
 Nikolaos Sargologos (November 1922 – September 1923), expelled from the party on charges of "espionage"
 Thomas Apostolidis (September 1923 – December 1924), expelled from the party on charges of "opportunism"
 Pandelis Pouliopoulos (December 1924 – September 1925)
 Eleftherios Stavridis (1925–1926), expelled from the party on charges of pro-bourgeoisies political position
 Pastias Giatsopoulos (September 1926– March 1927), expelled from the party on charges of "liquidarism"
 Andronikos Chaitas (March 1927 – 1931), expelled from the party and executed in the Soviet Union in 1935
 Nikos Zachariadis (1931–1936), first term
 Andreas Tsipas (July 1941 – September 1941)
 Georgios Siantos (January 1942 – 1945), caretaker until the return of Zachariadis
 Nikos Zachariadis (1945–1956), second term 
 Apostolos Grozos (1956)
 Konstantinos Koligiannis (1956–1972)
 Charilaos Florakis (1972–1989)
 Grigoris Farakos (1989–1991), resigned from the party to join Synaspismos
 Aleka Papariga (1991–2013)
 Dimitris Koutsoumpas (2013–present)

Election results

Hellenic Parliament

European Parliament

Party membership

See also 

 All-Workers Militant Front (PAME)
 International Meeting of Communist and Workers' Parties
Initiative of Communist and Workers' Parties
Socialism in Greece

Footnotes

Further reading 
 Dimitri Kitsikis, Populism, Eurocommunism and the Communist Party of Greece, in M. Waller, Communist Parties in Western Europe – Oxford, Blackwell, 1988.
 Dimitri Kitsikis, "Greece: Communism in a  Non-Western Setting," in D. E. Albright, Communism and Political Systems in Western Europe. Boulder, CO: Westview Press, 1979.
 Dimitri Kitsikis, "Greek Communists and the Karamanlis Government," Problems of Communism, vol.26 (January–February 1977), pp. 42–56.
 Artiem Ulunian, "The Communist Party of Greece and the Comintern: Evaluations, Instructions, and Subordination," in Tim Rees and Andrew Thorpe (eds.), International Communism and the Communist International, 1919–43. Manchester: Manchester University Press, 1998.

External links 

 
 
 Neni Panourgiá. Dangerous "Citizens Online". Online version of Dangerous Citizens: The Greek Left and the Terror of the State. .
 Gabriele D'Angeli (19 April 2012). "The KKE and the Greek revolution". National Committee of the Italian Young Communists.
 Dimitri Kitsikis (January 2010). Kitsikis/article "Grèce. Le Synaspismos tiraillé entre social-démocratie et anarchisme". Grande Europe. No. 16. La Documentation Française.
 Dimitri Kitsikis (1975). "Le mouvement communiste en Grèce". Études internationales. Vol. 6. No. 3.

 
Communist parties in Greece
Marxism–Leninism
Greece
Anti-revisionist organizations
Stalinist parties
Far-left politics in Greece
Far-left political parties
Eurosceptic parties in Greece
1918 establishments in Greece
Political parties established in 1918
Parties represented in the European Parliament
International Meeting of Communist and Workers Parties
Formerly banned communist parties